
Year 834 (DCCCXXXIV) was a common year starting on Thursday (link will display the full calendar) of the Julian calendar.

Events 
 By place 
 Europe 
 March 1 – Emperor Louis the Pious is restored as sole ruler of the Frankish Empire. After his re-accession to the throne, his eldest son Lothair I flees to Burgundy.
 Danish Vikings raid the trading settlement of Dorestad (present-day Wijk bij Duurstede), located in the southeast of the province of Utrecht (modern Netherlands).
 Summer – The Viking ship of Oseberg near Tønsberg (modern Norway) is buried in a mound, during the Viking Age (approximate date).
 The first mention is made of the Jona River ('the cold one') in Switzerland (approximate date).

 Britain 
 King Óengus II dies after a 14-year reign. He is succeeded by his nephew Drest IX, as ruler of the Picts.

 By topic 
 Religion 
 July 20 – Ansegisus, Frankish abbot and advisor of former emperor Charlemagne, dies at Fontenelle Abbey in Normandy (or 833).

Births 
 Aud the Deep-Minded, Icelandic queen
 Euthymius I, Ecumenical Patriarch of Constantinople (d. 917)
 Lady Shuiqiu, wife of Qian Kuan (d. 901)
 Mo Xuanqing, Chinese scholar
 Pi Rixiu, Chinese poet (approximate date)
 Robert, Frankish nobleman (d. 866)
 Tan Quanbo, Chinese warlord (d. 918)

Deaths 
 July 20 or 833 – Ansegisus, Frankish abbot 
 Adelchis I, duke of Spoleto (Italy)
 Cellach mac Brain, king of Leinster (Ireland)
 Fridugisus, Anglo-Saxon abbot (approximate date)
 Gaucelm, Frankish nobleman
 Nasr ibn 'Abdallah, Muslim governor
 Odo I, Frankish nobleman
 Óengus II, king of the Picts
 Robert III, Frankish nobleman (b. 800)
 Wang Chengyuan, Chinese general (b. 801)
 Wang Tingcou, general of the Tang Dynasty
 William, Frankish nobleman

References